Kumari Taki (born 6 May 1999) is a Kenyan middle-distance runner, who specialises in the 1500 meters. At junior level, he won gold medals in 1500 metres at the 2015 World Youth Championships, and at the 2016 World U20 Championships. He represented Kenya at the 2019 World Athletics Championships, competing in men's 1500 metres.

References

External links

Kenyan male middle-distance runners
1999 births
Living people
World Athletics Championships athletes for Kenya